The 2010 Carlton Rugby 7s was the second year of the Carlton Rugby 's tournament. Fiji Barbarians defeated Spain 36 - 07 in the final of the Cup.

Group stage

Pool A
 Barbarians 12 - 12 
 19 - 07 
 Barbarians  42 - 00 
 43 - 00 
 Barbarians 52 - 5 
  29 - 00 

{| class="wikitable" style="text-align: center;"
|-
!width="200"|Teams
!width="40"|Pld
!width="40"|W
!width="40"|D
!width="40"|L
!width="40"|PF
!width="40"|PA
!width="40"|+/−
!width="40"|Pts
|-style="background:#ccffcc"
|align=left|  Barbarians
|3||2||1||0||106||17||+86||8
|-style="background:#ccffcc"
|align=left| 
|3||2||1||0||84||12||+72||8
|-style="background:#ffe6bd"
|align=left| 
|3||1||0||2||24||102||-78||5
|-style="background:#fcc6bd"
|align=left| 
|3||0||0||3||7||90||−83||3
|}

Pool B
 Legends 26 - 07  Shujaa
 35 - 14 
 Shujaa 26 - 05 
 Legends  28 - 0 
 Shujaa 10 - 05 
 Legends 45 - 00 

{| class="wikitable" style="text-align: center;"
|-
!width="200"|Teams
!width="40"|Pld
!width="40"|W
!width="40"|D
!width="40"|L
!width="40"|PF
!width="40"|PA
!width="40"|+/−
!width="40"|Pts
|-style="background:#ccffcc"
|align=left|  Legends
|3||3||0||0||99||7||+92||9
|-style="background:#ccffcc"
|align=left|  Shujaa
|3||2||0||1||43||36||+7||7
|-style="background:#ffe6bd"
|align=left| 
|3||1||0||2||40||52||-12||5
|-style="background:#fcc6bd"
|align=left| 
|3||0||0||3||19||106||−137||3
|}

Pool C
 Barbarians  31 - 15 
 21 - 07  Arabian Gulf
 Barbarians 59 - 00 
 29 - 28  Arabian Gulf
 Barbarians 31 - 5  Arabian Gulf
  10 - 7 

{| class="wikitable" style="text-align: center;"
|-
!width="200"|Teams
!width="40"|Pld
!width="40"|W
!width="40"|D
!width="40"|L
!width="40"|PF
!width="40"|PA
!width="40"|+/−
!width="40"|Pts
|-style="background:#ccffcc"
|align=left|  Barbarians
|3||3||0||0||121||20||+101||9
|-style="background:#ccffcc"
|align=left| 
|3||2||0||1||54||66||-12||7
|-style="background:#ffe6bd"
|align=left| 
|3||1||0||2||28||73||-45||5
|-style="background:#fcc6bd"
|align=left|  Arabian Gulf
|3||0||0||3||40||81||−41||3
|}

Pool D
 Vipers 12 - 05  Legends
 26 - 19 
 Legends 52 - 5 
 Vipers 22 - 07 
 Legends 36 - 0 
 Vipers 33 - 19 

{| class="wikitable" style="text-align: center;"
|-
!width="200"|Teams
!width="40"|Pld
!width="40"|W
!width="40"|D
!width="40"|L
!width="40"|PF
!width="40"|PA
!width="40"|+/−
!width="40"|Pts
|-style="background:#ccffcc"
|align=left|  Vipers
|3||3||0||0||67||31||+36||9
|-style="background:#ccffcc"
|align=left|  Legends
|3||2||0||1||93||17||+76||7
|-style="background:#ffe6bd"
|align=left| 
|3||1||0||2||33||77||-44||5
|-style="background:#fcc6bd"
|align=left| 
|3||0||0||3||43||111||−68||3
|}

Second round

Bowl

Shield

Cup

Plate

References

2010
2010 rugby sevens competitions
2010 in Asian rugby union
rugby sevens